Timber wolf, timberwolf, timber wolves, or timberwolves might refer to:

Animals
 Any of several subspecies of Canis lupus, which inhabits forested areas, especially:
Eastern wolf, also known as the eastern timber wolf
 Northern Rocky Mountain wolf, a timber wolf that inhabits the northern Rocky Mountains 
 Northwestern wolf, also known as the Mackenzie Valley wolf, Alaskan timber wolf, Canadian timber wolf, or northern timber wolf

Arts and entertainment

Film
 The Timber Wolf, a 1925 American silent western film directed by W. S. Van Dyke

Rides
 Timber Wolf (roller coaster), at Worlds of Fun, Kansas City, Missouri
 Timberwolf Falls, a water ride at Canada's Wonderland

Military
 C14 Timberwolf, a sniper rifle
 IMI Timber Wolf, a pump-action carbine
 104th Infantry Division (United States), the "Timberwolf Division"

Sport
 Minnesota Timberwolves, a National Basketball Association franchise
 Miramichi Timberwolves, a Maritime Junior Hockey League team
 Northwood Timberwolves, teams of Northwood University
 Timberwolves, teams of Canadian International School of Hong Kong
 Spruce Timberwolves, teams of H. Grady Spruce High School
 Timpanogos Timberwolves, teams of Timpanogos High School
 Lake City Timberwolves, teams of Lake City High School
 Chiles Timberwolves, teams of Chiles High School in Tallahassee, FL
 Fort Bragg Timberwolves, teams of Fort Bragg High School
 Blue Valley Southwest Timberwolves, teams of Blue Valley Southwest Highschool

Other uses
 Timber Wolf (character), DC comics character
 Timberwolf, an age-based traditional scouting section in the Baden-Powell Service Association
 Timberwolf (web browser), for AmigaOS 4.1
 Bruce Fancher, alias "Timberwolf", a computer hacker
 Timber Wolf, a brand of snuff tobacco produced by Swedish Match
 Timberwolf, a Secret Service codename for president George H. W. Bush
 Timberwolf, a Crayola crayon color

Animal common name disambiguation pages